Robert "Robbie" Gladwell (born 16 June 1950), also known as Dr Robert, is an English rock and blues guitarist from London. He has been described as "one of Suffolk's most renowned musicians.

Music career 
Gladwell has played with numerous bands in the past 50 years and is perhaps best known for being the lead guitarist for Steve Harley and Cockney Rebel, firstly between 1990 and 1991, and then from 1999 onwards (sans 2015 and 2017–2019), playing both electric and acoustic guitars in the full rock band format, as well as Harley's 2–5 piece acoustic sets. He also played guitar for Suzi Quatro and many other musical artistes.

He has supported and toured with the Rolling Stones, BB King, Percy Sledge, Little Eva and has shared stages with David Gilmour and Tom Jones.

Gladwell has worked as a consultant for Gibson and Fender Guitars and wrote regular features for Guitarist magazine. He has also designed a guitar for Vintage.

He currently runs a custom guitar workshop 'Dr Robert's Guitar Surgery' Sudbury in Suffolk.

Books 
Gladwell has written and published a number of books on guitar repairs and customising:
Guitar Electronics and Customizing (1994)
Studio Recording Guitar Basics – Four Pack (2002)
Basic Kit Repair (2010)

Personal life 
Gladwell married singer-songwriter Sheri Kershaw in 1970, but the couple later divorced. He has five children, two of whom sing or play music.

References

External links 
 Official website
 Linked-In Profile

Date of birth missing (living people)
Living people
English rock guitarists
People from Sudbury, Suffolk
English blues guitarists
British luthiers
Steve Harley & Cockney Rebel members
1950 births